Pterostichus permundus is a species of woodland ground beetle in the family Carabidae. It is found in North America.

References

Further reading

 
 
 
 
 
 

Pterostichus
Beetles described in 1830